Buakea is a genus of moths of the family Noctuidae.

Species
Buakea kaeuae Moyal et al., 2011
Buakea obliquifascia Moyal et al., 2011
Buakea venusta Moyal et al., 2011

References

Xyleninae